SS Stephen Furdek was a Liberty ship built in the United States during World War II. She was named after Stephen Furdek, a Roman Catholic priest, co-founder of the First Catholic Slovak Union, commonly known as Jednota, and an ardent activist for Slovak identity and nationhood.

Construction
Stephen Furdek was laid down on 16 March 1944, under a Maritime Commission (MARCOM) contract, MC hull 2299, by J.A. Jones Construction, Panama City, Florida; she was launched on 28 April 1944.

History
She was allocated to Merchants & Miners Transportation Company, on 23 May 1944. On 27 September 1948, she was laid up in the National Defense Reserve Fleet, in Mobile, Alabama. She was withdrawn from the fleet on 1 June 1970.

References

Bibliography

 
 
 
 
 

 

Liberty ships
Ships built in Panama City, Florida
1944 ships
Mobile Reserve Fleet